Kaori Nakayama (中山香里) is a retired Japanese professional wrestler, who spent much of her career for Frontier Martial-Arts Wrestling.

Professional wrestling career
The daughter of former All Japan Women's Pro Wrestling star Miyoko Hoshino, Kaori Nakayama followed in her mother's footsteps and trained at the Frontier Martial-Arts Wrestling Dojo, where she was trained by another former AJW star, Megumi Kudo. She made her debut on July 19, 1994, against Mayumi Shimizu. After two years of paying dues, she slowly moved up the ranks. It was widely expected that Nakayama was going to be the next big female babyface after the retirement of Megumi Kudo. However, FMW and the media gave up on their women's division, abandoned the championships, and by the summer of 1998, all the women wrestlers left the promotion. However, Nakayama stayed loyal and remained with the promotion.

With no other females to wrestle, Nakayama was put in several intergender matches for over a year, before FMW signed Emi Motokawa in August 1999. Nakayama and Motokawa would alternate as partners and opponents. In 2000, Nakayama joined Masato Tanaka and Gedo and Jado in a stable called The Complete Players. In September 2000, Nakayama won her only championship, the WEW Six-Man Tag Team Championship, with Gedo and Jado, defeating Kodo Fuyuki, Mr. Gannosuke, and Shinjuku Shark. They would hold onto the titles, until January 2001, when they vacated the titles. A month later, Nakayama, Jado, Gedo, Tanaka, and Hideki Hosaka announced that they would be leaving FMW, citing problems with Shoichi Arai.

After leaving FMW, Nakayama became a freelancer, wrestling for various promotions, including BattlARTS, GAEA Japan, JWP Joshi Puroresu, Ladies Legend Pro-Wrestling, NEO Ladies, OZ Academy, Onita Pro, World W*ING Spirit, World Entertainment Wrestling, and Wrestling Marvelous Future. On October 23, 2002, she wrestled her retirement match, losing to Shark Tsuchiya.

Mixed martial arts career
In May 2001, Nakayama made her mixed martial arts debut at JEWELS' ReMix Golden Gate 2001 event, losing to Yeon Hwa Lee by judges' decision. In August 2002, she fought her second and final fight at Smackgirl's Summer Gate 2002 event, losing to Lay Ho by judges' decision.

Championships and accomplishments
Frontier Martial Arts Wrestling
WEW 6-Man Tag Team Championship (1 time) - with Gedo and Jado

Mixed martial arts record 

|-
|Loss
|align=center| 0–2
|
|Judges' unanimous decision
|Smackgirl Summer Gate 2002
|
|align=center| 3
|align=center| 5:00
|Tokyo, Japan
|
|-
|Loss
|align=center| 0–1
|
|Judges' decision
|Remix Golden Gate 2001
|
|align=center| 3
|align=center| 5:00
|Tokyo, Japan
|

References

External links
Kaori Nakayama's SHERDOG Profile
Kaori Nakayama's WrestlingData Profile

Japanese female professional wrestlers
Japanese female mixed martial artists
Mixed martial artists utilizing wrestling
1978 births
Living people
20th-century professional wrestlers
21st-century professional wrestlers
WEW 6-Man Tag Team Champions